Jarvis is a small community in Haldimand County, Ontario, Canada.

This community is located near the towns of Simcoe, Townsend, Cayuga, Port Dover and Hagersville. Highway 3 and Highway 6 form a crossroads near the centre of the community.

History 
Jarvis is located on land originally granted to William Jarvis, Provincial Secretary of Upper Canada from 1792 to 1817.

In on May 24, 1873, a fire destroyed a quarter of the town. Although there were no deaths a large amount of wooden structures in town were destroyed.

The town was much bigger in the early 1900s, featuring 4 churches, 4 hotels, 5 blacksmiths, a school, brickyard, and cheese factories.

Demographics 
96% of this community speaks English as its native tongue. There are at least 30 individuals that are born in Europe and at least 20 people who were born in Asia. The typical age of a Jarvis resident is between 30–39 years of age as of 2016. Due to the more youthful influence of the community and despite the lack of banking services within a safe and reasonable walking distance, Jarvis is not expected to have its majority of residents become senior citizens until at least 2046. Males typically outnumber females in Jarvis by 1.4%.

Sports  
Jarvis also is the home of the Jarvis Travelers Fastball team, winner of the ISC World Tournament of fast-pitch softball (fastball) in 2010. The town also features tennis courts. The Jarvis Lawn Bowling Club closed in 2013. The town currently has no ice skating facilities.

Business 
Businesses in the town of Jarvis include a gas station, a microbrewery, several restaurants, two convenience stores, beer and wine can be found. Jarvis also has a community centre that holds Jack and Jills along with weddings and other events.

There is also a car dealership that also sells motorcycle trikes, a flower store, a new and gently used children's clothing shop along with a butcher shop and bakery. There was only one bank in Jarvis (CIBC), which had served Jarvis since 1898 and officially closed on May 24, 2018, due to lack of business.

Education 
Schools include Jarvis Community Christian School (a member of the Ontario Alliance of Christian Schools) and Jarvis Public School.

Jarvis Public School has 22 students enrolled in grade 6 as of the 2017-18 school year. Slightly over 18% of the students at Jarvis Public School have some form of developmental disability. Grade 3 and 6 students at Jarvis Public perform the best at writing and the worst at mathematics. Recent testing has indicated that 40% of Jarvis Public School students in grade 3 and grade 6 are experiencing troubles coping with the current Ontario curriculum. Female students have somewhat of a bigger edge over the male students in reading; but the gulf between the male students and the female students is not so significant in math.

Tourist Attractions 
Michaud Toys is a very popular attraction in Jarvis; selling wooden toys and games with an excellent level of quality. Mostly purchased as Christmas presents, some of the best-selling toys at this store are dice and poker equipment.

D and D's Family Dining is a moderately expensive restaurant that offers Canadian cuisine along with vegetarian-friendly options. Offering an excellent level of service, their main options for meals include fish and chips, French onion soup, hot beef sandwich, shrimp dinner, along with barbecue ribs.

Just Johns is a moderately expensive pub that serves pizza in addition to Canadian cuisine. While the service is of very good quality, the food and the overall value of the meal are above average during the weekends and Friday evenings. Even though Just Johns is open year-round, the establishment is often visited between the months of April and November. Beer is served to patrons who are at least 19 years of age.

Jarvis used to host a festival in the month of August called "Cornfest" until 2012.The event had tonnes of fresh buttered corn to eat, as well many musical acts came to Jarvis to play at the festival. The main musical act for Cornfest 2010 was The Road Hammers. A notable Cornfest performance by the Canadian country rock music band Blue Rodeo was considered to be a high-profile event for a small community festival.

Royal Canadian Air Force Station Jarvis 

During World War II the Royal Canadian Air Force built and operated No. 1 Bombing & Gunnery School as part of the British Commonwealth Air Training Plan on a 600-acre site 6 kilometers southeast of Jarvis.  A historical plaque on Concession 2 Walpole marks the location, and the reverse side of the plaque lists the names of the thirty-eight Commonwealth airmen and one civilian who died while serving at No. 1 B&GS.

The air station appears in the 1942 Hollywood movie Captains of the Clouds.

References

Communities in Haldimand County
BCATP
Military history of Canada during World War II